Depew station could refer to:

 Buffalo–Depew station, an active station in Depew, New York

 Depew station (Lehigh Valley Railroad), a defunct station in Depew, New York